Mena Intermountain Municipal Airport  is a city-owned, public-use airport located two nautical miles (4 km) southeast of the central business district of Mena, a city in Polk County, Arkansas, United States. It is included in the National Plan of Integrated Airport Systems for 2011–2015, which categorized it as a general aviation facility.

Although most U.S. airports use the same three-letter location identifier for the FAA and IATA, this airport is assigned MEZ by the FAA but has no designation from the IATA (which assigned MEZ to Messina, South Africa). The airport's ICAO identifier is KMEZ.

Facilities and aircraft 
Mena Intermountain Municipal Airport covers an area of 667 acres (270 ha) at an elevation of 1,080 feet (329 m) above mean sea level. It has two runways with asphalt surfaces: 9/27 is 6,001 by 100 feet (1,829 x 30 m) and 17/35 is 5,000 by 75 feet (1,524 x 23 m).

For the 12-month period ending August 31, 2009, the airport had 31,000 aircraft operations, an average of 84 per day: 93% general aviation, 5% air taxi, and 2% military. At that time there were 43 aircraft based at this airport: 63% single-engine, 28% multi-engine, 7% jet, and 2% helicopter.

Allegations of CIA drug trafficking 
A number of allegations have been made about the use of Mena Intermountain Municipal Airport as a CIA drop point in large scale cocaine trafficking, beginning in the latter part of the 1980s.  Several local, state, and federal investigations have taken place in relation to these allegations. The topic has received some press coverage that has included allegations of awareness, participation and/or coverup involving prominent figures such as Reagan administration officials, then governor Bill Clinton and Saline County prosecutor Dan Harmon (who was convicted of numerous felonies including drug and racketeering charges in 1997). 

Attempts were made to investigate by both state and federal level law enforcement, however these efforts were frustrated.

An investigation by the CIA's inspector general concluded that the CIA had no involvement in or knowledge of any illegal activities that may have occurred in Mena. The report said that the agency had conducted a training exercise at the airport in partnership with another federal agency and that companies located at the airport had performed "routine aviation-related services on equipment owned by the CIA".

References

External links 
 Mena Intermountain Municipal Airport, official site
 Mena Intermountain Municipal (MEZ) at the Arkansas Department of Aeronautics
 Mena Air Center, the fixed-base operator (FBO)
 Aerial image as of March 2001 from USGS The National Map
 
 

Airports in Arkansas
Transportation in Polk County, Arkansas